Jutta Oesterle-Schwerin (25 February 1941 in Jerusalem) is a German politician, representative of the Social Democratic Party and later in life of Alliance '90/The Greens. She is the sister of Israeli historian Tom Segev.

Life 
Born and raised in Jerusalem to Jewish refugees from Germany, Oesterle-Schwerin's father Heinz Schwerin was killed in the  1948 Arab–Israeli War, and her mother Ricarda was a photographer. She studied Interior design in Stuttgart and graduated in 1969, and in 1974 became a member of Social Democratic Party (SPD). In 1980, (NATO Double-Track Decision), she left German party SPD and became 1983 a member of German party Alliance '90/The Greens. From 1987 to 1990 she was member of German Bundestag for Alliance '90/The Greens. On 28 November 1989, she objected to German reunification, stating that there was not a single sensible reason for German unity.
Until 2008 Oesterle-Schwerin worked as a freelance architect in Berlin.

See also
List of Social Democratic Party of Germany politicians

References

External links 
 Green Party in Bundestag
 Womennews:Interview with Jutta Oesterle-Schwerin (german)

1941 births
Living people
People from Jerusalem
German Jews
Social Democratic Party of Germany politicians
Members of the Bundestag for Baden-Württemberg
Sozialistischer Deutscher Studentenbund members
German people of Israeli descent

Female members of the Bundestag
20th-century German women politicians
Members of the Bundestag for Alliance 90/The Greens
LGBT members of the Bundestag
Lesbian politicians